Tarjanne (also Tarjannevesi) is a medium-sized lake in Finland. It is situated in the municipalities of Ruovesi, Virrat and Mänttä-Vilppula in the Pirkanmaa region in western Finland. The lake is part of the Kokemäenjoki basin. The main inflows are the lake Vaskivesi and a chain of lakes north of it in the west and a chain of lakes from the lake Pihlajavesi in the north. The lake drains into the Lake Ruovesi in the south.

See also
List of lakes in Finland

References

Mänttä-Vilppula
Kokemäenjoki basin
Landforms of Pirkanmaa
Lakes of Virrat